Angamaly Diocese may refer to:
 Angamaly Jacobite Orthodox Diocese
 Syro-Malabar Catholic Archdiocese of Ernakulam-Angamaly
 Angamaly Malankara Orthodox Diocese
 Angamali West Orthodox Diocese